Sosnowo Lock - the second lock on the Augustów Canal (from the Biebrza) in Poland near the village of Sosnowo in the administrative district of Gmina Sztabin, within Augustów County, Podlaskie Voivodeship, in north-eastern Poland.

As part of the Augustów Canal the lock was the first waterway (Summit level canal) in Central Europe to provide a direct link between the two major rivers, Vistula River and the Neman River, and it provided a link with the Black Sea to the south through the Oginski Canal, Dnieper River, Berezina Canal and Dvina River. It is currently a conservation protection zone proposed by Poland for inscription onto the World Heritage List of UNESCO.
. It was completely destroyed during WW II and was rebuilt in 1948.

Camping facilities are available next to the Lock.

Location: 13.2 kilometer 
Level difference: 2.77 m
Length: 43.5 m
Width: 6.10 m
Gates: Metal
Years Constructed: 1835-1836, rebuilt 1948
Project manager: Eng. Wojciech Korczakowski

References

 
 
 

19th-century establishments in Poland
Sosnowo Lock
Augustów County
Buildings and structures in Podlaskie Voivodeship